The South Australian Railways F class is a class of 4-6-2T steam locomotives operated by the South Australian Railways.

History
The F class hauled the majority of Adelaide's suburban passenger trains from its introduction in 1902. The first 22 were built by the Islington Railway Workshops. James Martin & Co built 12 units, with the remaining 10 built by Perry Engineering, the last entering service in October 1922.

The type replaced the smaller P class 2-4-0T engines, which were struggling with the increasing sizes of suburban passenger trains. From the 1930s, F class locomotives were replaced by 55 and 75 class Brill railcars on lightly patronized routes. They continued to see extensive service on popular routes until their displacement in 1955/56 by the diesel multiple unit Redhen railcars. Some engines were retained for shunting duties at Port Adelaide and Mile End with F225, the final member of the class being condemned in 1969.

The locomotives had saturated steam boilers and were considered attractive. While slow to accelerate away from stations, the locomotives were capable of reaching speeds of up to 60 mph (100 km/h). They were a capable locomotive, they faced few restrictions, except for the Belair line operations which were limited to three carriages.

Preserved examples
Three members of the class have been preserved:
F177(re-numbered to 245): plinthed at Gawler railway station
F251: by SteamRanger Heritage Railway
F255 by the National Railway Museum, Port Adelaide

References

External links

Railway locomotives introduced in 1902
F
4-6-2T locomotives
Broad gauge locomotives in Australia
Passenger locomotives